Kelly Pace may refer to:

 Kelly Pace (tennis) (born 1973), American tennis player
 Kelly Pace (footballer) (born 1991), Maltese footballer